"Turn Your Car Around" is the second single released from Blue member Lee Ryan's debut solo album, Lee Ryan. The track peaked at number 12 on the UK Singles Chart, also reaching the top 20 in several other European countries, including number two in Italy. The song was originally written and recorded by a New Zealand musician, Ben Novak, in 2004.

The music video features Ryan driving a Mustang in the desert, racing alongside a horse, getting a flat tyre, then walking off with the horse at the end.

Track listings
 UK CD1 (82876 71336 2)
 "Turn Your Car Around" – 3:04
 "Best Of You" (Radio 1 Live Lounge Session) – 2:53

 UK CD2 (82876 71336 5)
 "Turn Your Car Around" – 3:04
 "These Words (Gold Horizons)" – 3:14
 "Movin' On" – 3:30
 "Turn Your Car Around" (video) – 3:07

Charts

References

2005 singles
Lee Ryan songs
2004 songs
Sony BMG singles